Worthington is a civil parish in the Metropolitan Borough of Wigan, Greater Manchester, England.  It contains three listed buildings that are recorded in the National Heritage List for England.   Of these, two are listed at Grade II*, the middle grade, and the other is at Grade II, the lowest grade.  The parish is rural with no significant settlement, and the listed buildings are all houses.


Key

Buildings

References

Citations

Sources

Lists of listed buildings in Greater Manchester